(German: "ancient nobility"; adjective  or ) is a genealogical term introduced in late 18th-century Germany to distinguish those families whose noble rank can be traced to the 14th century or earlier. The word stands opposed to Briefadel, a term used for titles of nobility created in the early modern period or modern history by letters patent. Since the earliest known such letters were issued in the 14th century, those knightly families in northern European nobility whose noble rank predates these are designated .

 and  families are generally further divided into categories with their ranks of titles: adlig (untitled nobility), freiherrlich (baronial), gräflich (comital), fürstlich (princely) and herzoglich (ducal) houses. The latter two are also referred to as Hochadel (High Nobility).

Introduction and usage
The first use of the word  to designate the oldest nobility dates from 1788 and it had assumed its present-day meaning by no later than 1800. The term  was used officially from the 19th century by the Royal Prussian Herald Office. The term is found in the Almanach de Gotha from 1907, in which it is applied to all persons and families known to have been "noble" or "knightly" before 1400.

Contemporary use

Germany

The latter includes edelfreie families (free noblemen) as well as ministeriales, a lower and in their origins mostly unfree order which arose rapidly and managed within the 14th century to elevate themselves to the lesser nobility (see: Estates of the realm). In fact, most of the families in the former  volumes of the Gotha are of ministerialis origin, including even some of the later princely houses ("Hochadel", see below).

Edelfrei families were members of an ancient, dynastic aristocratic line, free noble families independent of legal obligations of a secondary nature, and they were not subordinated to any other families or dynasties, apart from the German King or Holy Roman Emperor. In contrast, the ministeriales, meaning originally "servitors" or "agents", were unfree nobles, however trained knights who made up a large majority of what could be described as the German knighthood during that time. These people were raised up from serfdom to be placed in positions of power and responsibility in the service of lords, counts or bishops. From about 1200 they gradually accumulated power and fiefs, at some point more than the Edelfrei knights. Poorer Edelfrei knights passed into ministerialis service, primarily to be granted new administrative positions and fiefs. The powerful overlords, mostly edelfrei themselves, had no interest in raising any competition to their power by sharing it with their peers, rather attempting to subject these by making them their vassals. In the 14th century, the edelfrei and ministerialis classes finally mixed and intermarried. Those ministeriales who directly served the German king or emperor (the "ministeriales of the Empire" or Reichsministerialen) often accumulated large imperial fiefs, later sometimes enabling them to rise to comital or princely rank.

Ministeriales mostly rose by elevation to the knightly status. Knightings were usually granted to squires having bravely fought as armored horsemen in a battle, yet sometimes also to simple men-at-arms. A ministeriales family however was considered a "knightly family" only after three subsequent generations of knights (or at least of leading a "knightly way of life", including equal marriage). Since it is a coincidence from what period of time documents have been received or not, the initially more strict definition, as described in Der Große Brockhaus in 1928 (vol. 1, s.v. "Adel"), which required an attestation prior to the year 1350 to establish  status, has been extended to the year 1400 because even the knightly families documented as dating from the Late Middle Ages (between about 1350 and 1400) are likely to have had already at least a century of possessing that status. Many have in fact risen to noble or knightly status already before 1300.

 is also closely connected with the system of medieval fiefs, granted by an overlord to a vassal who held it in fealty (or "in fee") in return for a form of feudal allegiance and service, usually given by the personal ceremonies of homage and fealty. Therefore feudal deeds are an important source not only for the existence of noble families, but also for their rank and status. Witness lists, for instance, mostly enumerate edelfreie witnesses first, followed by ministeriales witnesses, mostly denoted as eques (knight) or something similar.

In contrast, the younger Briefadel are families of the post-medieval nobility, probably originally of bourgeois (Bürger, burgher) or peasant origin, ennobled in the modern era by letters patent issued by a monarch, usually with the award of a coat of arms if they did not already have one. Said to have been modelled on the earlier French practice of raising officials (especially lawyers) to the aristocracy, the earliest letters patent conferring nobility in Germany were issued under Charles IV, Holy Roman Emperor, in the late 14th century.

Austria

Scandinavia
The term  can be found in Scandinavian genealogy from the early 20th century. The contrasting term  was calqued as brevadel.

The 1926 edition of the Swedish Nordisk familjebok also cites 1350 as the required date, because "the oldest known letter patent dates to 1360". The letters patent referred to here is that issued by Holy Roman Emperor Charles IV to Wicker Frosch, a burgher of Frankfurt, on 30 September 1360. Svenska Akademiens ordbok mentions "circa 1420" as the threshold date. In Norway, one of the earliest known letters patent is of 1458.

Hochadel (High Nobility)

The Almanach de Gotha (followed by subsequent series) differentiates between three sections of Hochadel. The first section listed Europe's sovereign houses, whether they reigned as emperor, king, grand duke, duke or prince. The second section contained the Mediatized Houses of Germany, which lost their semi-sovereignty within the Holy Roman Empire during the period of German mediatization between 1803 and 1815. The third section included the titular princely and ducal houses of Europe that never ruled as sovereigns.

Eggenberg, Biron and Wrede families that rose to the rank of Fürst (prince). On a European level, there are some more examples of royal or princely families that rose to the high nobility after the middle ages, such as the House of Bonaparte (and other Napoleonic families like the House of Bernadotte, Ney, Murat, Fouché d'Otrante, Berthier of Wagram, etc.), the Italian princes Torlonia and the Russian princes Demidov.

See also 
 Nobles of the Sword, approximate French equivalent 
 Extended family
 Clan

References
 Notes

 Bibliography
 

Titles of nobility of the Holy Roman Empire
Austrian noble titles
Danish nobility
German noble titles
Norwegian nobility
Swedish nobility

de:Deutscher Adel#Uradel / Alter Adel